The Church of the Intercession of the Holy Virgin is a Russian Orthodox church in Konstantinovsk, Rostov Oblast, Russia that belongs to the Diocese of Volgodnosk and was built in 1912 on the project of architect Pyotr Studenikin.

History

The Church of the Intercession of the Holy Virgin began to be constructed in spring of 1907 on the project of architect Pyotr Studenikin. The building was completed in 1912.

In 1930, the church building was turned into a granary. During World War II, when Konstantinovsk was occupied by Wehrmacht forces, it was used as an ammunition depot. Soon it was handed over to the Orthodox community (which was officially registered in 1945) again. Liturgies continued to be held there until the late 1960s. In the early 1960s, the church was renovated with its interior being redecorated. Later, it was closed again and housed a gym which was functioning there until the late 1980s.

In 1988, the Church of the Intercession was transferred to the Russian Orthodox Church again and liturgies have been held there since then.

Architecture 
The Church of the Intercession is built in an Eclecticist style with Byzantine, Italian Renaissance and Russian Revival architecture elements being presented. The Intercession Church is built of bricks. The external brickwork of the walls is left unplastered, and that is an important element of the facade decoration. Today, the church is one of the highest buildings in Konstantinovsk, for the majority of town buildings only have one story.

References

Churches in Rostov Oblast
1907 establishments in the Russian Empire
Churches completed in 1912
Cultural heritage monuments of regional significance in Rostov Oblast
Russian Orthodox church buildings in Russia